Rafeeq Curry (born August 19, 1983, in Miami, Florida) is an American triple jumper. He is a 2002 U.S. junior champion, a 2006 NCAA outdoor triple jump champion, a nine-time All-American, two-time East Regional champion, six-time Atlantic Coast Conference titleholder, 2011 USA indoor Champion. Curry currently holds FSU's indoor and outdoor records for the triple jump. He also posted a personal best of 17.22 metres by winning the men's triple jump at the NCAA East Regional Meet in Tallahassee, Florida. Curry is a member of the track and field team for the Florida Seminoles, and a graduate of Florida State University.

Curry earned a spot on the U.S. team for the 2008 Summer Olympics in Beijing, by placing third, and edging out two-time Olympian and world champion Walter Davis at the U.S. Olympic Trials in Eugene, Oregon, with a best jump of 17.21 metres (56–6 ft). He competed as a member of U.S. track and field team in the men's triple jump, along with his teammates Aarik Wilson and Kenta Bell. Curry performed the best jump at 16.88 metres from his third and last attempt, but fell short in his bid for the final, as he placed nineteenth overall in the qualifying rounds.

References

External links

NBC 2008 Olympics profile

1983 births
Living people
American male triple jumpers
African-American male track and field athletes
Olympic track and field athletes of the United States
Athletes (track and field) at the 2008 Summer Olympics
Track and field athletes from Miami
Sportspeople from Tallahassee, Florida
USA Indoor Track and Field Championships winners
21st-century African-American sportspeople
20th-century African-American people